The Palazzo Canacci, also known as Palazzo Canacci-Giandonati is a Gothic-style palace located in Piazza di Parte Guelfa 3 in central Florence, region of Tuscany, Italy. It stand across the piazza  the former church of San Biagio, and separated by an alley from the Palazzo di Parte Guelfa.

History
The palace was commissioned by the Canacci family in the second half of the 15th century. The third story of the palace contains a loggetta with columns, restored only in 1902 to its open state by Giuseppe Castellucci. The palace was once united to the Palazzo Giandonati. The facade graffiti decoration in the lower stories was added at this time. The portal has the heraldic shield of the Canacci family with a dog's head and three chains linked to a ring. The Canacci family died out in 1778 with the death of Cosimo Canacci. The palace was nearly destroyed during the urban renewal performed to create the nearby Piazza della Repubblica.

Gallery

Bibliography
Translated in part from Italian Wikipedia entry
Marcello Vannucci, Splendidi palazzi di Firenze, Le Lettere, Firenze 1995.

References

Canacci
Canacci